Stasinopoulos or Stassinopoulos, feminine form Stasinopoulou (Στασινοπούλου), is a Greek surname. It can refer to:

 Arianna Stassinopoulou, birth name of Arianna Huffington (born 1950), Greek-American author and founder of The Huffington Post
 Christos Stassinopoulos, Greek opera singer, recitalist and actor
 Michail Stasinopoulos (1903–2002), Greek jurist and President of Greece

Greek-language surnames
Surnames